is a railway station on the Minobu Line of Central Japan Railway Company (JR Central) located in the town of Minobu, Minamikoma District, Yamanashi Prefecture, Japan.

Lines
Kai-Ōshima Station is served by the Minobu Line and is located 39.8 kilometers from the southern terminus of the line at Fuji Station.

Layout
Kai-Ōshima Station has a single island platform connected to a small station building containing a waiting room by a level crossing. The station is unattended.

Platform

Adjacent stations

History
Kai-Ōshima Station was opened on April 8, 1919 as a station on the original Fuji-Minobu Line. The line came under control of the Japanese Government Railways on May 1, 1941. The JGR became the JNR (Japan National Railway) after World War II. Along with the division and privatization of JNR on April 1, 1987, the station came under the control and operation of the Central Japan Railway Company. The current station building was completed in February 2000.

Surrounding area
 Fuji River

See also
 List of railway stations in Japan

External links

 Minobu Line station information 

Railway stations in Japan opened in 1919
Railway stations in Yamanashi Prefecture
Minobu Line
Minobu, Yamanashi
1919 establishments in Japan